Therkathi Kallan is a 1988 Indian Tamil language action comedy film produced, written and directed by P. Kalaimani. The film stars Vijayakanth and Raadhika. It is a remake of the Telugu film Bhanumati Gari Mogudu.

Plot 

Because he wishes to acquire a plot of land to be autonomous, Kallan, a villager tries his luck by wanting to be a movie star in the capital and finally becomes a stuntman. His path crosses that charming but arrogant feminist Radha, a wealthy heiress. He marries her further to a compromise. The couple quickly collides due to their excess big social difference but especially very fast realizes that it shares not at all the same values. And their troubles are only beginning, rather funny at first. But the crossing time, their married life becomes a disaster...

Cast 

Vijayakanth as Kallan
Raadhika as Radha
Sulakshana
Madhuri
V. K. Ramasamy as Advocate
S. S. Chandran as Film director
Ravichandran
Malaysia Vasudevan
Janagaraj as Pandian
Thyagu
Idichapuli Selvaraj  as Assistant director
Vennira Aadai Moorthy as Servant
Chinni Jayanth
Poornam Viswanathan
M. R. Krishnamurthy
Typist Gopu as Manager
Periya Karuppu Thevar
S. N. Lakshmi as Kallan's mother
Kutty Padmini
Gandhimathi

Soundtrack 
The music was composed by Ilaiyaraaja and lyrics were written by Gangai Amaran. The song "Thilla Thaangu" inspired the chorus of "Thanga Sela" in Kaala (2018).

Reception 
The Indian Express wrote, "The 'taming of the shrew' line has been somewhat of a lasting preoccupation with our filmmakers. But it's interesting how it gets projected in the Indian context".

References

External links 
 

1988 films
Films scored by Ilaiyaraaja
1980s Tamil-language films
Indian action comedy films
Tamil remakes of Telugu films
1988 action comedy films